Ceratocumatidae is a family of crustaceans of the order Cumacea. Ceratocumatidae have a small free telson. The endopods (interior branches) of the uropods are present on only one segment. Males have 5, 4 or 3 pairs of pleopods. All maxillipeds and some of the pereiopods bear exopods (outer branches). The gill apparatus has no supporting gill plates.

References 

Cumacea
Crustacean families